Trnovo is a municipality of the city of Istočno Sarajevo located in Republika Srpska, an entity of Bosnia and Herzegovina.

As of 2013, the municipality had a population of 2,050 inhabitants. The town itself had a total population of 1,023, with 956 of them living in the Republika Srpska part and 67 in the Federation part.

It consists of roughly one third of the pre-war municipality of Trnovo. Roughly two thirds of the pre-war Trnovo municipality is now part of the Federation of Bosnia and Herzegovina entity.

Geography
Trnovo is situated south of Sarajevo on the M-18 road Sarajevo-Trnovo-Foča-Trebinje. It is surrounded by the Jahorina, Bjelašnica and Treskavica mountains which were the locations of Olympic competitions during the 1984 Winter Olympics. Those mountains are popular destinations for a variety of winter sports and activities.

The Željeznica river is one of the town's chief geographic features. It flows through the town and municipality from south through the center of Trnovo, Kijevo and East Sarajevo to west part of Sarajevo City eventually meets with the Bosna river.

Settlements
Aside from the town of Trnovo, the municipality includes the following settlements:

 Bašci
 Bistročaj
 Bogatići
 Boljanovići
 Divčići
 Donja Presjenica
 Govedovići
 Grab
 Gračanica
 Ilovice
 Jablanica
 Kijevo
 Klanac
 Kozija Luka
 Milje
 Podivič
 Rajski Do
 Slavljevići
 Tošići
 Turovi
 Ulobići
 Vrbovnik
 Zabojska

Demographics
The pre-war municipality, with 63 settlements, had a total population of 6,991 people, of whom Muslims consisted 68.81% and Serbs 29.45% of total population. Most of the Serb-inhabited settlements became part of the Trnovo municipality of Republika Srpska. The 2013 census preliminary results counted 2,192 inhabitants of the municipality of Trnovo in RS, and 1,018 in the settlement of Trnovo in RS.

Population

Ethnic composition

Gallery

References

External links

Trnovo Municipality, Official Website

Populated places in Trnovo, Republika Srpska
Istočno Sarajevo
Cities and towns in Republika Srpska
Trnovo, Republika Srpska
Populated places in Trnovo, Sarajevo